Troy William Slaten (born February 21, 1975) is an American attorney, media pundit, candidate for Los Angeles Superior Court Judge, former actor, former Managing Attorney of Slaten Lawyers, APC, and Administrative Law Judge for the State of California. Best known as Michael Lacey on ‘’Cagney and Lacey’’ (1982-1988).

Biography
Slaten was born in Los Angeles. He starred in several television series in supporting roles during the 1980s and the 1990s. He was on the 1980s series Cagney & Lacey as Michael Lacey, one of the on-screen children of Mary Beth Lacey (Tyne Daly) and Harvey Lacey Sr.(John Karlen), and later, he appeared in the series Superhuman Samurai Syber-Squad as Amp. His most memorable role was on the series Parker Lewis Can't Lose as Jerry Steiner.

Slaten graduated from UCLA with Honors earning a B.A. in English Literature, earned a J.D. degree from Pepperdine University's School of Law, and became an attorney practicing corporate law and litigation in Southern California and a partner with the law offices of Floyd, Skeren, Manukian & Langevin, LLP. , Slaten is a partner of the firm's Los Angeles County Practice.

Slaten appeared on Ken Reid's TV Guidance Counselor podcast on June 15, 2016.

Slaten has been a legal analyst for several broadcast networks and their subsidiaries, including Fox News Channel, CNN, HLN, CBS, and NBC. He has been a frequent guest on television shows. including Nancy Grace, Dr. Drew, Happening Now, The O'Reilly Factor, Shepard Smith Reporting, and Primetime Justice.

In the March 3, 2020 Presidential Primary election, Slaten unsuccessfully ran for judge of the Los Angeles Superior Court in Seat 145, where he received over 560,000 votes.

In the June 7, 2022 Primary election, Slaten is on the ballot for judge of the Los Angeles Superior Court in Seat 60.

Filmography

References

External links

1975 births
American male child actors
American male television actors
Lawyers from Los Angeles
Living people
Pepperdine University School of Law alumni
University of California, Los Angeles alumni
Jewish American male actors
21st-century American Jews